Corymbia arafurica is a species of tree that is endemic to the Northern Territory. It has smooth bark, lance-shaped adult leaves, flower buds in groups of three or seven, creamy white flowers and cylindrical to barrel-shaped fruit.

Description
It has smooth, powdery white to greyish bark that is shed in thin scales, sometimes with a short stocking of rough bark near the base of the trunk. Flowering occurs from September to October and the flowers are creamy white.

Taxonomy and naming
Eucalyptus arafurica was first formally described in 1995 by Ken Hill and Lawrie Johnson from specimens collected near Oenpelli (present-day Gunbalanya) by Raymond Specht in 1948. The specific epithet (arafurica) refers to the occurrence of this species near the Arafura Sea.

The status of this species is unclear. Ian Brooker has suggested that it may be synonymous with C. papuana.

Distribution and habitat
This eucalypt is common near watercourses and on headlands in the wetter areas of the Top End of the Northern Territory between Port Keats, Darwin, Yirrkala and the Wessel Islands.

See also
 List of Corymbia species

References

arafurica
Myrtales of Australia
Flora of the Northern Territory
Plants described in 1995